Segimer or Sigimer ( or ; fl. 1st century BC) was a chieftain of the Germanic Cherusci tribe. He is chiefly remembered as the father of Arminius, who led the Germans to victory over the Romans at Teutoburg Forest in AD9.

Life
Segimer was a chief of the Cherusci during the late 1st centuryBC and early 1st centuryAD. He may have led the Cherusci in their successful ambush of Drusus's army at Arbalo in the summer or autumn of 11BC. By winter, Drusus was maintaining a Roman garrison in Cherusci territory and, following Drusus's campaigns, the Cherusci became an ally of the Roman Empire. Segimer had two sons, known only by their Latin names Arminius and Flavus. They were closely involved with the Romans and both joined the Roman military. His son Arminius led the Germans to victory over three Roman legions in the Battle of Teutoburg Forest in AD9. Cassius Dio's account of the battle includes that Segimer was Arminius's second in command during the battle. Segimer is not mentioned by Tacitus in his accounts of Germanicus's subsequent reprisal campaigns in Germany, although his brother Inguiomer appears. Arminius appears to have succeeded Segimer as chieftain at some point in the early 1st century AD and was subsequently attacked by the Marcomanni chieftain Maroboduus together with his uncle Inguiomer in AD17 or 18.

Segimer's son Flavus appears to have remained loyal to Rome throughout the period and his son Italicus succeeded Arminius as chieftain with Roman assistance.

See also
 Barbarians, a 2020 TV show in which Segimer appears

References

Citations

Bibliography
 .
 .

1st-century BC monarchs in Europe
1st-century monarchs in Europe
1st-century BC Germanic people
1st-century Germanic people
Cherusci rulers